Paeromopodidae is a family of large cylindrical millipedes of the order Julida native to the western United States of America.

Description
Paeromopodids have distinct parallel grooves called striae on their body rings that give a somewhat roughened texture and distinguishes them from other cylindrical western millipedes. Individuals may be rather uniformly blue gray, or colored in alternating bands of light and dark brown, or may possess a dorsal lengthwise stripe of yellow or light brown.

Distribution
Paeromopodids are endemic to the United States and occur in two distinct areas: the first is a large Pacific coast range extending from Washington state to the southern Sierra Nevada and Death Valley region of California and east to the Warner Mountains straddling the borders of California, Oregon, and Nevada; and the second is a region spanning extreme northeastern Oregon, across the Idaho Panhandle to western Montana. Species of Paeromopus are generally larger than Californiulus, and occur only in California. Species of Californiulus occur in California as well as the rest of the range of the family.

Ecology and behavior
Paeromopodids are relatively active and fast-moving millipedes, with a high degree of flexibility. Many species are found under rocks or moist, rotten logs as opposed to buried in leaf litter, and species of Californiulus may prefer drier microhabitats than Paeromopus. C. blechrostriatus inhabits the arid eastern slopes of the Sierra into Death Valley, and has been found at elevations of up to 2,400 m (8,000 ft).

Species
Genus Californiulus 
Californiulus blechrostriatus
Californiulus chamberlini
Californiulus dorsovittatus
Californiulus euphanus
Californiulus parvior
Californiulus yosemitensis

Genus Paeromopus
Paeromopus angusticeps
Paeromopus cavicolens
Paeromopus eldoradus
Paeromopus paniculus

References

Julida
Millipedes of North America
Endemic fauna of the United States
Fauna of the Western United States
Millipede families